TSBD may refer to:
Texas School Book Depository
The Spoils Before Dying